Momo Yansane (born 29 July 1997) is a Guinean professional footballer who plays as a forward for Russian Premier League club Pari NN on loan from the Moldovan club FC Sheriff Tiraspol, and the Guinea national football team.

Career

Club
On 29 January 2021, Nizhny Novgorod announced the signing of Yansane.

On 1 July 2021, Sheriff Tiraspol announced the signing of Yansane. On 8 September 2022, Yansane returned to Pari NN on a season-long loan with an option to buy.

International
Yansane played for Guinea at 2017 Africa U-20 Cup of Nations and 2017 FIFA U-20 World Cup. He debuted with the senior Guinea national team in a 1–1 2022 FIFA World Cup qualification tie with Sudan on 6 October 2021.

Career statistics

Club

References

External links 
 
 

1997 births
Susu people
People from Boké Region
Living people
Guinean footballers
Guinea under-20 international footballers
Guinea international footballers
Association football forwards
Hafia FC players
Fath Union Sport players
FC Isloch Minsk Raion players
FC Nizhny Novgorod (2015) players
FC Sheriff Tiraspol players
Guinée Championnat National players
Botola players
Belarusian Premier League players
Russian First League players
Moldovan Super Liga players
Russian Premier League players
Guinean expatriate footballers
Expatriate footballers in Morocco
Guinean expatriate sportspeople in Morocco
Expatriate footballers in Belarus
Guinean expatriate sportspeople in Belarus
Expatriate footballers in Mali
Guinean expatriate sportspeople in Mali
Expatriate footballers in Russia
Guinean expatriate sportspeople in Russia
Expatriate footballers in Moldova
Guinean expatriate sportspeople in Moldova